Dinner Lake is a  lake located in Sebring, Florida. The lake is part of the Eastern Complex of the Central Ridge subdivision of the Lake Wales division of the Central Lake District (of Florida).

Dinner Lake has one boat ramp, located on the north shore of the lake.

See also
Basket Lake

References
 Florida Lakewatch
 Highlands County Soil and Water Conservation District

Lakes of Highlands County, Florida
Sebring, Florida
Lakes of Florida